"Rebels Without a Clue" is a song written by David Bellamy, and recorded by American country music duo The Bellamy Brothers.  It was released in September 1988 as the first single and title track from the album Rebels Without a Clue.  The song reached number 9 on the Billboard Hot Country Singles & Tracks chart.

Chart performance

References

1988 singles
1988 songs
The Bellamy Brothers songs
Song recordings produced by James Stroud
Song recordings produced by Jimmy Bowen
MCA Records singles
Curb Records singles
Songs written by David Bellamy (singer)